Likee (formerly LIKE) is a short-video creation and sharing app, available for iOS and Android operating systems. It is owned by Singaporean tech firm BIGO Technology, whose parent company is JOYY Inc., a Chinese firm listed on NASDAQ. The founder of Likee is Jason Hu, entrepreneur from Singapore, who previously worked for JOYY.

The app's capabilities include visual effects, including 4D Magic and Dynamic Stickers, as well as video shooting and editing.

History 
Likee was originally known as LIKE until mid-2019, when it was rebranded and redesigned.

As of the second quarter of 2019, Likee's mobile monthly active users had reached 80.7 million. 

In 2017, Likee was rated as one of Google Play's Best Entertainment Applications.

Features 

The Likee mobile app allows users to easily create and edit videos using a variety of augmented reality effects.

Privacy concerns 

As with other video apps, Likee has been condemned by the international community for privacy and inappropriate content. Various law enforcement agencies have warned that the app could expose children to sexual predators.

In response to privacy  concerns, BIGO Technology added parental control features in 2019, allowing parents and guardians of Likee users to remotely control or restrict access to the app's content. However, watchdog groups have described the parental controls as "ineffective".

In June 2020, the Government of India banned Likee along with 58 other apps that were ultimately owned by Chinese companies such as TikTok, citing data and privacy issues, and added that it was a threat to the sovereignty and security of the country. Border tensions in 2020 between India and China and subsequent deterioration of relations instigated the ban.

See also 

 TikTok
 Triller

References

External links 

 

Android (operating system) software
IOS software
Video software
Singaporean social networking websites
Video hosting
Internet properties established in 2017
Internet censorship in India